Cerro al Lambro is a comune (municipality) in the Metropolitan City of Milan in the Italian region Lombardy, located about  southeast of Milan.

Cerro al Lambro borders the following municipalities: Vizzolo Predabissi (MI), Carpiano (MI), Melegnano (MI), San Zenone al Lambro (MI), Bascapè (PV) and Casaletto Lodigiano (LO).

References

External links
  Official website

Cities and towns in Lombardy